Edward H. Bagley  (October, 1863 – July 24, 1919) was an American Major League Baseball pitcher from 1884 to 1885.

References

External links
Baseball Reference

19th-century baseball players
Major League Baseball pitchers
Baseball players from New York (state)
New York Gothams players
New York Metropolitans players
1863 births
1919 deaths
Brockton (minor league baseball) players
Bridgeport Giants players
Waterbury Brass Citys players